The Besarabsky Market (Besarabs'kyi rynok), also referred to as the Besarabka, is an indoor market located in the center of Kyiv on the Bessarabska Square at the southwest end of the city's main thoroughfare, the Khreshchatyk. Constructed from 1910 to 1912 to a design of Polish architect Henryk Julian Gay, the market features  of market space.

Its name originates from Bessarabia, a region conquered by the Russian Empire during the Russo-Turkish Wars and now partially located in southwestern Ukraine on the territory of the Odessa Oblast (province).

See also
 Lazar Brodsky
 Market (place)
 Retail

References

External links

 Vokrug sveta magazine - section in the article on Khreshchatyk. 
   Бессарабський ринок  in Wiki-Encyclopedia Kyiv 

Buildings and structures in Kyiv
Bazaars in Ukraine
Besarabsky
Shopping malls established in 1912
Art Nouveau architecture in Kyiv
Art Nouveau retail buildings
Commercial buildings completed in 1912
1912 establishments in the Russian Empire
1912 establishments in Ukraine